Under a Shady Tree is the Two Tomatoes Records and Capitol Records album by children's musician Laurie Berkner. It was released in November 2002, and distributed by Universal Records.

Track listing 
 "Under a Shady Tree" (2:50)
 "Rhubarb Pie (Hot Commodity") (2:36)
 "Mr." (2:14)
 "Drive My Car" (1:45)
 "I'm Gonna Catch You" (3:23)
 "Just Like the Sun" (2:12)
 "Mahalo" (2:27)
 "I'm Me and You're You" (1:38) 
 "Choc-o-Lot in My Pock-o-Lot" (2:26)
 "Shortnin' Bread" (1:49)
 "Running Down the Hill" (3:14) 
 "My Energy" (1:54)
 "After It Rains" (1:39)
 "Do the Dragon" (5:12)
 "Song in My Tummy" (2:51)
 "This Hat" (2:20)
 "Who's That?" (1:35)
 "Smile" (3:00)
 "Boody Boody Ya Ya Ya" (3:30)
 "Blow a Kiss" (2:47)
 [Hidden Track] (:10)

Production 

 Recorded at: Hoboken Curve Studio, Hoboken, NJ
 Mastered by: Scott Anthony at The Viewing Room

Laurie Berkner albums
2002 albums
Capitol Records albums
Universal Records albums